The Atlantic Collegiate Football Conference was a short-lived NCAA Division III football conference composed of member schools located in the Northeastern United States. The league existed from 1988 to 1991.

Champions
 1988 –  (4–0)
 1990 –  (5–0)
 1991 –  (3–0)

Yearly standings

See also
 List of defunct college football conferences

References

Defunct college sports conferences in the United States